Augustus Meyer Lochner (1 October 1827 – 20 February 1865) was an English soldier who played as a cricketer in one match for Tasmania. He was born in Enfield and died in Plumstead Common.

Lochner made a single first-class appearance for the side, during the 1853–54 season, against Victoria. He scored 19 not out in the first innings in which he batted, and a single run in the second.

Military career
In 1845, Augustus Lochner was a "gentleman cadet" and the Royal Military Academy, Woolwich. In May 1846, he became a second lieutenant in the Royal Engineers, and in November of the same year he was promoted to first lieutenant. Lochner continued with his military career: in 1859, he is recorded as being promoted from second captain to full captain in the Royal Engineers. He was a serving officer with the rank of captain at the time of his death in 1865.

See also
 List of Tasmanian representative cricketers

References

External links
Augustus Lochner at Cricket Archive

1827 births
1865 deaths
English cricketers
Tasmania cricketers